KTXO 94.7 FM is a radio station licensed to Goldsmith, Texas.  The station broadcasts a classic country format, simulcasting KCKM 1330 AM Monahans, Texas and is owned by West Texas Broadcasting, LLC.  Its studios are in Monahans and the transmitter is in Goldsmith.

References

External links
KTXO's official website

TXO